Earl Rowe may refer to:

 William Earl Rowe (1894–1984), Lieutenant Governor of Ontario
 Earl W. Rowe (born 1951), politician in Ontario, Canada